"Broken Wings" is a 1985 song recorded by American pop rock band Mr. Mister. It was released in June 1985 as the lead single from their second album Welcome to the Real World. The song peaked at number one on the Billboard Hot 100 in December 1985, where it remained for two weeks. It was released as the band was just about to embark on a US tour opening for Tina Turner. "Broken Wings" became the first of two consecutive number ones of the band on the American charts, the other chart-topper being "Kyrie". Outside of the United States, "Broken Wings" topped the charts in Canada, peaked within the top ten of the charts in Australia, Belgium (Flanders), the Netherlands, Norway, the Republic of Ireland, Switzerland, the United Kingdom and West Germany, and the top twenty of the charts in Austria, New Zealand, Spain and Sweden.

Background and music 
The ballad was co-written with lyricist John Lang, who was inspired by Kahlil Gibran's novel Broken Wings. The song is a mix of synth, digitally delayed guitar, bass and drums.  The song's hissing intro was an effect created by the sound of a crash cymbal played in reverse.

Although the 1968 Beatles song "Blackbird" contains an identical lyric, "Take these broken wings and learn to fly", Richard Page has described this as "a mindless unintentional reference" attributable to both compositions being influenced by the Gibran novel.

Music video 
The music video for "Broken Wings" was directed by Oley Sassone and filmed in black and white. It features lead vocalist/bassist Richard Page driving through the desert in a classic Ford Thunderbird, the first allusion to birds. There is a scene where Page is sitting in a church when a Harris's Hawk flies in through the window and lands next to him on the pew and they exchange a gaze. The full band is also featured in performance scenes. Also appearing in the video are an unknown man and woman dancing tango. They are only shown from the waist down. At the end of the video Page is seen next to the Thunderbird with the vehicle's hood open.

Reception 
Stereogum said the lyrics were:

Track listing 
7" Single
"Broken Wings" (single edit) – 4:29
"Uniform of Youth" – 4:25

12" Maxi Single
"Broken Wings" (album version) – 5:45
"Uniform of Youth" – 4:25
"Welcome to the Real World" – 4:18

Charts

Weekly charts

Year-end charts

All-time charts

Certifications

C-Block version 

In 1998, C-Block covered the song and released it on the album Keepin' It Real. Large parts of the original were retained but supplemented by rap passages. The success was modest in German-speaking countries.

Music video 
The music video is split into two acts: Mr. P sings his part on a platform in the sea, while Goldie "Gold" Holloway does his part in a demonstration. Also, Theresa "Misty" Baltimore sings her part. The plot is also accompanied by landscape and sky photographs. In the end, all three band members are united.

Track listings 
CD-Maxi
 Broken Wings (Radio Version) – 3:59
 Broken Wings (Bird's Eye Mix) – 5:07
 Being Raised (Album Version) – 4:15
 Magic Hip Hop Dreams – 6:46

Charts

K'Lee Version 
K'Lee's first single was a cover of Mr. Mister's "Broken Wings" which peaked at number 2 on the New Zealand Singles Chart. From her debut self-titled album.

Chart

Samples 
"Broken Wings" was sampled in the posthumous Tupac Shakur's single "Until the End of Time". The song also features Richard Page, lead singer of Mr. Mister, on vocals, and reached No. 4 in the UK.

References

External links 
 

1985 songs
1985 singles
1998 singles
Billboard Hot 100 number-one singles
Black-and-white music videos
Cashbox number-one singles
Mr. Mister songs
Rock ballads
RCA Records singles
RPM Top Singles number-one singles
Songs written by Richard Page (musician)
Songs written by Steve George (keyboardist)
Pop ballads
1980s ballads
Music based on novels